Thomalina Adams (born 6 July 1993 in Lüderitz, Namibia) is a Namibian  footballer who plays as a midfielder for Tura Magic.

Club career
In 2011 Adams and Uerikondjera Kasaona joined Germania Hauenhorst to play in the 2011–12 Verbandsliga Westfalen season. Adams spent the 2012–13 season in Namibia without playing experience as the Super League did not resume until 2015. In 2013 Adams returned to Germany to play for the VfL Bochum in the 2013–14 2. Bundesliga season.

In 2016 Adams and Zenatha Coleman joined to Gintra Universitetas.

Career statistics

International career
Adams is a member of the Namibia women's national football team. She was part of the Namibian team at the 2014 African Women's Championship.

References

External links

1993 births
Living people
Women's association football midfielders
Namibian women's footballers
Namibia women's international footballers
2. Frauen-Bundesliga players
Expatriate women's footballers in Germany
Expatriate women's footballers in Lithuania
Namibian expatriate sportspeople in Germany
Namibian expatriate sportspeople in Lithuania
VfL Bochum (women) players
Gintra Universitetas players
Namibian expatriate women's footballers